Virtua Willingboro Hospital is a 249-bed community hospital located in Willingboro, New Jersey.  It was previously known as Lourdes Medical Center.

Services
The Lourdes Cancer Center provides diagnostic, surgical, medical oncology, radiation therapy and other modalities. It has a boutique that assists patients with aesthetic needs, a cancer resource center and support groups. The Lourdes Cancer Center is accredited by the American College of Surgeons’ Commission on Cancer.

The Acuity Specialty Hospital is a 30-bed facility long term case facility.  It serves r seriously ill patients who require extended hospital stays (an average of 25 days) before returning home.  Patients are admitted directly from short-stay hospitals, often from intensive care units, with ventilator-dependent respiratory failure or other complex medical conditions that require aggressive and continuous acute-care services. The unit is designed for patients with cardiopulmonary conditions resulting from trauma; a severe medical illness or post-operative problem, or the development of an acute illness superimposed on a chronic illness like malnutrition, cardiac disease or chronic obstructive pulmonary disease (COPD). Patients get the time to heal before being transferred to a rehab hospital or skilled nursing facility.

Behavioral Health: A 10-bed voluntary unit and 18-bed involuntary unit provide patients with various behavioral therapies.

Surgery: Minimally invasive procedures to treat urologic conditions and kidney disease are performed here. Bariatric and orthopedic surgeries also are done at the hospital.

References

Hospitals in New Jersey
Willingboro Township, New Jersey
Buildings and structures in Burlington County, New Jersey